The 2018 Taça de Macau was the 2018 iteration of the Taça de Macau, the top football knockout competition in Macau.

Bracket

Bold = winner
* = after extra time, = penalty shootout score

Fixtures and results

First round

Quarter-finals

Semi-finals

Third place match

Final

See also
2018 Liga de Elite

References

External links
Macau Football Association 

2
Macau